The Hon. Herbert Henry McKenley OM (10 July 1922 – 26 November 2007) was a Jamaican track and field sprinter. He competed at the 1948 and 1952 Olympics in six events in total, and won one gold and three silver medals.

He was also the AAU champion in the 440-yard dash in 1945, 1947 and 1948, and was also the head of the list of world best times in 100 m (10.3), 200 m (20.4) and 400 m (46.2) in 1947. He is the only person to ever have achieved this feat.

But at the Olympics itself, McKenley finished only second in 400 m, behind teammate Arthur Wint and was fourth in 200 m. He probably lost a gold medal in the 4 × 400 m relay when Wint pulled his muscle in the final. He is the only person to have made the final in all three sprinting events, the 100 m, 200 m and 400 m in the Olympics.

Perhaps because of his success across the wide variation of distances, McKenley was known to have an uneven pace, blasting out to an early lead, but slowing towards the end of a 400 meters. 23 August 1947, on a wind-aided straight, boardwalk at Long Branch, New Jersey, McKenley was timed in 45.0 for 440 yards, a claimant to being the first person to break the 45 second barrier at 400 meters.

At the first 1951 Pan-American Games in Buenos Aires, McKenley was third in 100 m, 200 m and 400 m, the only person to ever perform this feat.

At the Helsinki Olympics, McKenley was second in 100 m (the first four clocked 10.4 in a very close race) and also second in 400 m. He finally got his Olympic gold, when he helped the Jamaican 4 × 400 m relay team to win the race with a new world record of 3.03.9. His remarkable 44.6 leg is credited with pulling Jamaica into contention. It is considered one of the greatest relay legs in history.

After retiring from sports, McKenley was a coach of the Jamaica national team from 1954 to 1973 and served also as a president of Jamaica Amateur Athletics Association. For his contributions in track and field, he was awarded the Jamaican Order of Merit in 2004.

McKenley died at the University Hospital of the West Indies, according to Howard Aris, president of the Jamaica Amateur Athletics Association, who was speaking for the family. The cause of death was complications of pneumonia.

Competition record

References

External links
 Obituary in The New York Times, 28 November 2007

1922 births
2007 deaths
People from Clarendon Parish, Jamaica
Jamaican male sprinters
Olympic male sprinters
Olympic athletes of Jamaica
Olympic gold medalists for Jamaica
Olympic silver medalists for Jamaica
Olympic gold medalists in athletics (track and field)
Olympic silver medalists in athletics (track and field)
Athletes (track and field) at the 1948 Summer Olympics
Athletes (track and field) at the 1952 Summer Olympics
Medalists at the 1948 Summer Olympics
Medalists at the 1952 Summer Olympics
Pan American Games bronze medalists for Jamaica
Pan American Games medalists in athletics (track and field)
Athletes (track and field) at the 1951 Pan American Games
Central American and Caribbean Games gold medalists for Jamaica
Central American and Caribbean Games silver medalists for Jamaica
Central American and Caribbean Games medalists in athletics
Competitors at the 1950 Central American and Caribbean Games
Japan Championships in Athletics winners
Australian Athletics Championships winners
USA Outdoor Track and Field Championships winners
World record setters in athletics (track and field)
Recipients of the Order of Merit (Jamaica)
Illinois Fighting Illini men's track and field athletes
Medalists at the 1951 Pan American Games
Deaths from pneumonia in Jamaica
Jamaican expatriates in the United States